Haliclystus sanjuanensis is a species of small (~4 cm) stalked jellyfish found in the Pacific Ocean along the west coast of North America. This species can be found in shallow waters at low tide on soft substrates such as seagrass (Phyllospadix). A variety of colour morphs can be found ranging from yellow-green to red. Haliclystus sanjuanensis remains undescribed officially, despite sequence data establishing it as a distinct taxon.

Gallery
Colour morphs of Haliclystus sanjuanensis:

References

Haliclystidae